Turkey Ridge is an unincorporated community in Turner County, in the U.S. state of South Dakota.

The community takes its name from nearby Turkey Ridge, an elevation noted for its population of wild turkeys.

References

Unincorporated communities in Turner County, South Dakota
Unincorporated communities in South Dakota